Grand admiral is a historic naval rank, the highest rank in the several European navies that used it. A comparable rank in modern navies is that of admiral of the fleet.

Grand admirals in individual navies

Sweden 

In Sweden the rank of grand admiral was only ever awarded twice. Once to Prince Charles (XIII), whom was given the title at birth and which was used by him as the commander of the Swedish Royal Navy and once to Crown prince Oscar (I) as a courtesy title to honour his adoptive grandfather, the late king Charles XIII.

France
In Bourbon Restoration France, the rank was an honorific one equivalent to that of marshal in the French Army.

Germany

Like field marshals its holders were authorised to carry a baton.

The rank was created in 1901 and discontinued in 1945, after eight men were promoted to it.

Imperial Germany
Before and during World War I, the following were made grand admirals of the Imperial German Navy:

 King Edward VII of the United Kingdom (26 June 1902)
  (28 June 1905)
 King Oscar II of Sweden (13 July 1905)
 Prince Henry of Prussia (4 September 1909)
  (27 January 1911)
  (31 July 1918)

Nazi Germany

There were no more grand admirals until 1939. The following men were made grand admirals during the Nazi regime:

 , commander of the U-Boat fleet, was made a grand admiral on 30 January 1943 upon succeeding Raeder as Commander-in-Chief.

Austria-Hungary

 1911: Archduke Charles Stephen of Austria (1860–1933)
 12 May 1916:  (1851–1917)
 9 October 1916: Prince Henry of Prussia (1862–1929)
 1 November 1916: Kaiser Charles I of Austria (1887–1922)
 22 February 1917: Kaiser Wilhelm II of Germany (1859–1941)

Italy
It was established primarily to honour , who had been head of the Italian  during World War I — he was the only person to be awarded the rank. It was equivalent to marshal of Italy in the army and also marshal of the Air Force.

Peru
In 1967 the rank of Grand Admiral of Peru was awarded posthumously to Miguel Grau Seminario and is equivalent to the army rank of Grand Marshal of Peru.

In fiction
Among the several grand admirals appearing in fiction and science fiction, one notable figure is Grand Admiral Thrawn of the Star Wars science fiction franchise.

References

Naval ranks of Germany
Military ranks of Austria
Military ranks of Italy
Military ranks of France
Fictional military ranks